Los años perdidos (English title: The lost years) is a Mexican telenovela produced by Raúl Lozano Telere for Televisa in 1987. It is a sequel of telenovelas Los años felices and Los años pasan. It starred by Rogelio Guerra, Silvia Pasquel, Ana Colchero and Alejandro Aragón.

Cast 
Rogelio Guerra
Silvia Pasquel
Ana Colchero
Alejandro Aragón
Javier Marc
Romina Castro

References

External links 

1987 telenovelas
Mexican telenovelas
Televisa telenovelas
1987 Mexican television series debuts
1988 Mexican television series endings
Spanish-language telenovelas
Television shows set in Mexico